Pateros Church, also known as the San Roque Parish Church, is a Roman Catholic church under the order of the Augustinians located in the municipality of Pateros, Metro Manila, Philippines.

History
Founded after the division of Pateros to Pasig by Fray Andres Vehil.

Architecture
The plan was created by Fray Santos Gomez Marañon and completed on July 1, 1815, to start the construction.

Roman Catholic churches in Metro Manila
Pateros
Roman Catholic churches completed in 1815
19th-century Roman Catholic church buildings in the Philippines